Samuel Percy Currie (22 November 1889 – 7 December 1962) was a Scottish professional footballer who made over 230 appearances in the Football League for Leicester City as a full-back. He captained the club.

Career 
Born in Kilwinning, Scotland, Currie began his career with his hometown junior club Kilwinning Rangers, with whom he 1908–09 Scottish Junior Cup. He moved to England to join Football League Second Division club Leicester Fosse in May 1909. Between 1909 and 1922, he made 248 senior appearances, in addition to a further 123 non-competitive appearances during the First World War. Currie ended his career in the Third Division North with Wigan Borough, for whom he made 33 appearances before being appointed player-coach of the reserve team in March 1924.

Personal life 
Currie's brothers Bob and Duncan also became footballers.

Career statistics

Honours 
Kilwinning Rangers

 Scottish Junior Cup: 1908–09

References

1889 births
1962 deaths
People from Kilwinning
Scottish footballers
Association football fullbacks
Kilwinning Rangers F.C. players
Leicester City F.C. players
English Football League players
Wigan Borough F.C. players
Footballers from North Ayrshire
Scottish Junior Football Association players